Alcea rosea, the common hollyhock, is an ornamental dicot flowering plant in the family Malvaceae. It was imported into Europe from southwestern China during, or possibly before, the 15th century. William Turner, a herbalist of the time, gave it the name  "holyoke" from which the English name derives.

Cultivation

Alcea rosea is variously described as a biennial (having a two-year life cycle), as an annual, or as a short-lived perennial. It frequently self-sows, which may create a perception that the plants are perennial. The plant may flower during its first year when sown early.  It will grow in a wide range of soils, and can easily reach a height of 

The flowers are in a range of colours from white to dark red, including pink, yellow and orange.  Different colours prefer different soils. The darker red variety seems to favour sandy soils, while the lighter colour seems to favour clay soils.  The plants are easily grown from seed, and readily self-seed.  However, tender plants, whether young from seed or from old stock, may be wiped out by slugs and snails. The foliage is subject to attack from rust (Puccinia malvacearum), which may be treated with fungicides. Commercial growers have reported that some closely related species (Alcea rugosa and Alcea ficifolia) are resistant to this fungus.

Properties
Growing up to 8 feet tall, this plant usually does not require staking, producing large flowers around 5 inches in diameter. Its leaves are large and heart-shaped. The flowers attract hummingbirds and butterflies.

Pests and diseases
The leaves are vulnerable to rust, leaf spot and anthracnose. Pest problems include Japanese beetle and spider mites. Though damage to the leaves can be extensive, the flowers are rarely affected.

Herbalism
In herbal medicine, hollyhock is believed to be an emollient and laxative. It is used to control inflammation, to stop bedwetting and as a mouthwash in cases of bleeding gums.

Gallery

References

rosea
Flora of China
Medicinal plants of Asia
Plants described in 1753
Taxa named by Carl Linnaeus
Flora of Malta